USHS may refer to:

 Central Luzon State University Science High School, Muñoz, Nueva Ecija, Philippines
 United South High School, Laredo, Texas, United States
 Utah State Historical Society